Paperboy is an arcade action game developed and published by Atari Games and Midway Games, and released in 1985. The player takes the role of a paperboy who delivers a fictional newspaper called The Daily Sun along a suburban street on his bicycle. The arcade version of the game featured bike handlebars as the controller.

The game was ported to many home systems beginning in 1986. A sequel for home computers and consoles, Paperboy 2, was released in 1991.

Gameplay

The player controls a paperboy on a bicycle delivering newspapers along a suburban street which is displayed in a cabinet perspective (or oblique projection) view. The player attempts to deliver a week of daily newspapers to subscribing customers, attempts to vandalize non-subscribers' homes and must avoid hazards along the street. Subscribers are lost by missing a delivery or damaging a subscriber's house. If the player loses all of their lives, or runs out of subscribers, the game ends.

The game begins with a choice of difficulty levels: Easy Street, Middle Road and Hard Way.  The object of the game is to perfectly deliver papers to subscribers for an entire week and avoid crashing (which counts as one of the player's lives) before the week ends.  The game lasts for seven in-game days, Monday through Sunday.

Controlling the paperboy with the handlebar controls, the player attempts to deliver newspapers to subscribers. Each day begins by showing an overview of the street indicating subscribers and non-subscribers. Subscribers and non-subscribers' homes are also easy to discern in the level itself, with subscribers living in brightly colored houses, and non-subscribers living in dark houses.

The player scores points for each paper delivered successfully (either at a subscriber's doorstep or inside their mailbox, the latter of which awards more points), as well as breakage points by damaging the houses of non-subscribers.  A perfect delivery (all subscribers get their papers, and none of their houses are damaged) results in all the points being worth double for that day, and an extra subscriber is added.  At the end of each stage is a training course with various obstacles to throw papers at (which gives bonus points) and to jump over, and the player scores a bonus for finishing the course.  Crashing on the course ends the round, but does not cost the player a life.

When a player fails to deliver a paper to a house, or damages a subscriber's house by breaking their windows, the resident will cancel their subscription, and the house turns dark. The player can regain subscribers by getting a perfect delivery, which adds one extra subscriber.

The paperboy can hold no more than ten papers at once, although refills can be found throughout the level. The papers can also be used to stun enemies (with the exception of cars).

Development
The cabinet of this game is a standard upright but with custom controls.  The controls consist of a bicycle handlebar (a modified Star Wars yoke) with one button on each side, used to throw papers. The handlebars can be pushed forward to accelerate and pulled back to brake.

The game runs on the Atari System 2 hardware. The CPU is a 10 MHz Digital Equipment Corporation (DEC) T-11. For sound and coin inputs, it uses a 2.2 MHz MOS Technology 6502. The sound chips are two POKEYs for digital sound, a Yamaha YM2151 for music, and a Texas Instruments TMS5220 for speech. The protection chip is a Slapstic model 137412-105.

The game program code for the arcade version was written in BLISS.

Ports
Elite Systems produced a version for the ZX Spectrum which was released in the United Kingdom in September 1986, and went on to release versions for the Commodore 64, BBC Micro, Acorn Electron, Amstrad CPC, Commodore 16 and Commodore Plus/4 over the following months.

A version for the Apple IIGS was released in 1988. In the United States, a Nintendo Entertainment System (NES) version was developed by Eastridge Technology and published by Mindscape in December 1988. Coverage of the NES version abruptly began at the Summer CES 1988 as a last-minute replacement for a port of the computer title Bad Street Brawler, which was about to be ported to the NES. In October 1989, Elite released versions for the Atari ST and PC in the United Kingdom, followed by an Amiga version later that month. The game was released for the Famicom by Altron in January 1991.

In the United Kingdom, a Game Boy version by Mindscape was released in October or November 1990. A Master System version, by Sega and U.S. Gold, was released in the United Kingdom in November 1990. Atari released a version of Paperboy for the Atari Lynx in 1990. By March 1991, an NES version by Mindscape had been released in the United Kingdom. Tengen however released versions for the Sega Genesis and Sega Game Gear in 1992.

Reception

In Japan, Game Machine listed Paperboy on their November 1, 1985 issue as being the fifth most-successful upright arcade unit of the month. In the United States, it was the top-grossing arcade software conversion kit in December 1985. 

Upon its debut at London's Amusement Trades Exhibition International (ATEI) show in early 1985, Computer and Video Games magazine gave the arcade game a mixed review, praising the controls but criticizing the difficulty. The arcade game was runner-up for Computer Gamer magazine's best coin-op game award, which was won by Capcom's Commando. In 2007, Spanner Spencer of Eurogamer rated the arcade version 9 out of 10 and praised its gameplay, graphics, and music.

The ZX Spectrum port topped the UK monthly sales chart in September 1986, and the release of the Commodore 64 version took the game to the number one position again in November. It went on to become the seventh best-selling computer game of 1986 in the UK.

Advanced Computer Entertainment (ACE) offered praise for the Atari ST version, awarding it a score of 850 out of 1,000, while Zero gave it a score of 86 out of 100. ACE and Zero noted that the Atari ST version looked and played like the arcade version. Computer Gamer gave the ZX Spectrum version a rating of 16 out of 20, considering it to be a faithful conversion of the arcade game, while noting that some people may find the gameplay to be repetitive. For the ZX Spectrum, Commodore 64 and Amstrad CPC versions, ACE gave the game a rating of 5 out of 5, noting the "extremely well executed" graphics and referring to the game as a "budget classic." UK magazine Computer and Video Games (CVG) gave the Commodore 64 version a 52 percent rating, criticizing its music and "blocky and ill-proportioned" sprites; the magazine gave the ZX Spectrum version an 83 percent rating. Ken McMahon of Commodore User reviewed the Commodore 16 and Commodore Plus/4 version and rated it 6 out of 10, noting that it was too easy.

Crash gave the ZX Spectrum version an 88% rating with the general rating "Another slick, playable conversion from Elite", while  Zzap!64 was less enthusiastic for the Commodore 64 version giving it 44%. In 1993, Zzap!64 rated the Commodore 64 version a 60 percent score, calling it repetitive. Richard Leadbetter of CVG reviewed the Lynx version and stated, "Looks good, but simply isn't enough fun to play." STarts Clayton Walnum similarly praised the Lynx version's graphics and sound effects but deemed the game "just another shoot-em-up without the shooting." Raze offered praise for the clear and colorful graphics of the Lynx version, but stated that the game "is too old and tired for the exciting and new Lynx." AllGame's Kyle Knight criticized the Lynx version for its simple sound effects and music, as well as its repetitive gameplay.

Leadbetter praised the Master System version, calling it "one of the best arcade conversions" available for the system, while noting that the game's only "slight downer" was the music. Mean Machines praised the Master System version for its graphics and similarities to the arcade game, while Raze wrote a mixed review for the Master System version. Mean Machines was critical of the NES version for its graphics, sound, and controls, and concluded that it was, "A highly offensive product which weighs in as a sadly derisive conversion of a classic coin-op." Brett Alan Weiss of AllGame stated that Mindscape did a good job of porting the game to the NES. Weiss praised the controls and sound effects of the NES version, but criticized the music. Raze considered the Game Boy version to be "Excellent", while Mean Machines criticized its controls, blurry scrolling, and the lack of colorful graphics, which could not be produced by the system. ACE noted slightly difficult controls and poor sound effects for the Game Boy version.

The One gave the Amiga version 80% stating that "it's an almost flawless conversion" of the arcade game. ACE gave the Amiga version a rating of 878, calling it a perfect conversion of the arcade game. Tony Dillon of Commodore User gave the Amiga version an 83 percent rating and considered it to be nearly identical to the arcade version. Gordon Houghton of CVG gave the Amiga version a 69 percent rating, stating that the sound was "arguably better" than the arcade version, but noting that the graphics were "jerky" and that the gameplay had been altered from the arcade version. Houghton concluded that it was "not a bad game, but it's too old and too expensive to deserve greater praise." Compute! praised the music and graphics of the Amiga version, but considered the gameplay to be outdated and repetitive. Robert A. Jung of IGN reviewed the Lynx version in 1999, and considered it to be a "decent" adaptation of the arcade game. Jung noted the game's "average-quality" graphics and sound, and concluded, "Not a bad game, though not one of the Lynx's best."

IGN's Craig Harris reviewed a Game Boy Color version and stated that it "is definitely the worst rendition of the game, even beating out the Atari Lynx's waterdown port of the arcade game." Harris criticized the game's music, the lack of speech audio from the original game, poor collision detection, and a lack of fun. Scott Alan Marriott of AllGame praised the Game Boy Color version for its colorful graphics, but noted that the game did not introduce any new changes from the original arcade version, writing, "Those expecting a lot of changes or additions will be disappointed."

Later Releases

Versions of Paperboy were released for the Nintendo 64, Xbox 360 and iPhone and iPod Touch. Dean Austin of IGN criticized the retro 3D look of the Nintendo 64 version, but praised the gameplay and considered it to be a "great game." Daniel Erickson of Daily Radar criticized the "bland" and "repetitive" gameplay of the Nintendo 64 version. Robert Amsbury of Game-Revolution praised the sound effects in the Nintendo 64 version, but considered the music to be repetitive, while noting that the game "isn't really all that fun." Weiss criticized the Nintendo 64 version for its music and sound effects, as well as poor controls, and wrote that the game had "some of the ugliest graphics you'll find in a Nintendo 64 cartridge." Ben Stahl of GameSpot noted the outdated sound effects used in the Nintendo 64 version, and stated, "While a decent game on its own, Paper Boy 64 doesn't capture the magic of the original arcade game." IGN's Levi Buchanan, reviewing a cell phone version, praised the controls and stated that the game looked and played like the original arcade game.

According to Metacritic, the Xbox 360 version received "Mixed or average reviews." TeamXbox gave the Xbox 360 version an overall score of 8.2, stating that "Paperboy "delivers" as advertised in the classifieds." Greg Sewart of GamesRadar considered the Xbox 360 version to be an "authentic recreation" of the arcade version, but noted that the game, like previous versions, suffers from imprecise controls due to the absence of the arcade game's handlebar controller. Jeff Gerstmann of GameSpot reviewed the Xbox 360 release and was disappointed by the lack of new sound effects and music, as well as the lack of graphical updates. Gerstmann stated that the game would most likely appeal to people who "have fond memories" of the original arcade game. IGN's Erik Brudvig, reviewing the Xbox 360 version, considered the game to be a limited amount of fun. Brudvig noted the lack of a handlebar controller and stated that, "Thanks to the isometric view, this version of Paperboy suffers from the same wonky controls that every home version of the game has." Kristan Reed of Eurogamer praised the Xbox 360 release for its controls and noted that the game "stands up pretty well" despite its age, although he stated that the game quickly becomes repetitive. Corey Cohen of Official Xbox Magazine praised the Xbox 360 version for its music and controls, and noted that it was as appealing as the arcade version.

Tarryn van der Byl of Pocket Gamer criticized the iPhone version for its poor controls, and stated that the game's optional 3D graphics mode was "ugly and feels clumsy and inaccurate." Slide to Play considered the iPhone/iPod version a "mixed bag", but praised the gameplay. Mark Langshaw of Digital Spy reviewed the iPhone version and stated that it would likely appeal most to fans of the original game. Langshaw concluded, "As far as nostalgic remakes go, Paperboy delivers but doesn't quite do enough to make the front page."

According to Metacritic, Paperboy: Special Delivery has a score of 55 out of 100, indicating "Mixed or average reviews." Blake Patterson of TouchArcade considered Paperboy: Special Delivery to be an improvement over Elite's iPhone version, praising the improved controls and graphics. Jon Mundy of Pocket Gamer rated the game 5 out of 10, criticizing the gameplay and controls, and writing that the biggest flaw "is the game's technical shortcomings. The graphics are extremely basic and yet the game paused and stuttered repeatedly on my second-generation iPod touch." Andrew Nesvadba of AppSpy rated the game 3 out of 5, praising the updated graphics while criticizing the controls. Nesvadba also praised the addition of a story mode, but criticized its short length. Jeremiah Leif Johnson of Gamezebo gave the game three stars out of five, praising the story mode and the 1980s-style graphics, but criticizing the poor controls.

Legacy
A sequel, Paperboy 2, was released in 1991 for several home systems.

Paperboy, in its original arcade form, is included in the 1998 PlayStation video game Arcade's Greatest Hits: The Atari Collection 2. The Game Boy Color version, developed by Digital Eclipse Software and published by Midway Games, was released in the United States on May 30, 1999. By July 1997, developer High Voltage Software had begun conceptual development of the Nintendo 64 version and was searching for a game publisher, with a possible release in 1998. In August 1998, Midway Games announced that it would be publishing the Nintendo 64 game, which was still in conceptual stages and was expected for release in late 1999. The game was developed using a 3D polygonal game engine, and was released in the United States on October 26, 1999.

In May 2000, Midway announced plans to release Paperboy for the PlayStation later that year, although the game was never released. Paperboy was later included in the 2003 video game Midway Arcade Treasures, a compilation of arcade games for the GameCube, PlayStation 2, Xbox, and Microsoft Windows. In 2005, Paperboy was included in the compilation Midway Arcade Treasures: Extended Play for the PlayStation Portable. In May 2005, Sega Mobile announced that it would release Paperboy for mobile phones. The game was released in May 2006. The Xbox 360 version of Paperboy was released on February 14, 2007, on Xbox Live Arcade; however, the game was removed by 2010.

The iPhone/iPod Touch version was released through the App Store on December 18, 2009. The game was developed by Vivid Games and published by Elite Systems. Elite removed the game from the App Store in March 2010, because of a licensing conflict. Glu Mobile developed and published a new iPhone/iPod Touch version, titled Paperboy: Special Delivery, on November 4, 2010. The game included a 20-level story mode in which the paperboy is saving money from his job to buy a new game console, but he later falls in love and throws roses instead of newspapers. The game also featured an optional tilt-based control mode in which the iPhone is tilted to control the paperboy.

A port of Paperboy can be accessed in the 2015 video game Lego Dimensions by using the Arcade Dock in the level "Painting the Town Black".  It is also an included title on the Midway Legacy Edition Arcade1Up cabinet.

In other media
Along with Hyper Sports, Paperboy formed one of the computer game rounds in a children's television quiz, First Class, shown on BBC in the 1980s.
The game makes a cameo appearance in the 1986 comedy film Police Academy 3.
The paperboy character makes cameo appearances in the 2012 Disney animated film Wreck-It Ralph and in trailers and TV spots of the 2015 film Pixels.

References

External links

Review in Isaac Asimov's Science Fiction Magazine

1985 video games
Amiga games
Amstrad CPC games
Apple II games
Arcade video games
Atari arcade games
Atari Lynx games
Atari ST games
Apple IIGS games
BBC Micro and Acorn Electron games
Commodore 16 and Plus/4 games
Commodore 64 games
Cycling video games
DOS games
Game Boy Color games
Game Boy games
Game Gear games
Midway video games
Mobile games
Nintendo Entertainment System games
Nintendo 64 games
PlayStation (console) games
Sega Genesis games
Master System games
IOS games
Tiertex Design Studios games
Tiger Electronics handheld games
TRS-80 Color Computer games
U.S. Gold games
Xbox 360 Live Arcade games
ZX Spectrum games
Video games scored by Mark Cooksey
Video games developed in the United States
Video games with oblique graphics
Newspaper distribution in fiction
Mindscape games
Multiplayer and single-player video games